

Season standings

Game log

September
Record for month: 1–4–1 (home: 0–1–0; away: 1–3–1).

October
Record for month: 3–0–2 (home: 3–0–1; away: 0–0–1).

November
Record for month: 3–4–1 (home: 1–2–1; away: 2–2–0).

December
Record for month: 3–4-0 (home: 1–1–0; away 2–3–0).

January
Record for month: 4–2–0 (home: 1–0–0; away 3–2–0).

February
Record for month: 3–4–0 (home: 1–1–0; away: 2–3–0).

March
Record for month: 1–2–0 (home: 1–0–0; away 0–2–0).

Green background indicates win.
Red background indicates regulation loss.
White background indicates overtime/shootout loss.

Roster 

Goaltenders:

•
•

Defensemen

•
•
•
•
•

Forwards

•
•
•
•
•
•
•
•
•
•
•
•

Player stats

Scoring leaders

Note: GP = Games played; G = Goals; A = Assists; Pts = Total Points; PIM = Penalty Minutes

Transactions

Free agents acquired

Free agents lost

Awards and records
 Johan Molin - EIHL Second Team All Star

References

Game Log:  on Internationalhockey.net
Team Standings:  on HockeyDB.com

External links
Official site of the Manchester Phoenix

Gui
Manchester Phoenix seasons